Dirichletia is a genus of flowering plants in the family Rubiaceae. The genus is found northeastern tropical Africa to Namibia.

Species
Dirichletia glaucescens Hiern - Ethiopia, Somalia, Kenya, Tanzania
Dirichletia obovata Balf.f. - Socotra
Dirichletia pubescens Klotzsch - Malawi, Mozambique, Zambia, Zimbabwe, Namibia
Dirichletia somaliensis (Puff) Kårehed & B.Bremer - northeastern Somalia
Dirichletia virgata (Balf.f.) Kårehed & B.Bremer - Socotra

References

External links
Dirichletia in the World Checklist of Rubiaceae

Rubiaceae genera
Knoxieae
Flora of Africa